Jeffrey Jon Bower (born May 28, 1953) is a former American football player and coach. He served as the head football coach at University of Southern Mississippi for 18 seasons, from 1990 to 2007, compiling a record of 119–83–1. Bower assumed the role of head coach at Southern Miss on December 2, 1990 and announced his retirement on November 26, 2007, effective after the 2007 PapaJohns.com Bowl, which was played on December 22. The Golden Eagles had a winning record in Bowers' final 14 seasons and played in a bowl game in 10 of his last 11 seasons.

Early life and playing career
Bower grew up in Roswell, Georgia, where he attended Roswell High School. He led the football team to two state championships and became a prep All-American, one of the school's first. He also started for two state champion baseball teams and one state champion basketball squad. He was named Class A Player of the year and played in the state All-Star game.

Bower started his college football career at the University of Georgia before transferring to Southern Miss. He started as quarterback in 1973. His career records from 1973 to 1975 are still in the top five for many of the school's passing statistics, including third all-time in passing percentage.

Coaching career
Bower spent 29 years at the University of Southern Mississippi as a quarterback, assistant coach and head coach. He was named "Coach of the Decade" by Conference USA in 2004.

Head coaching record

References

1953 births
Living people
American football quarterbacks
Georgia Bulldogs football players
Oklahoma State Cowboys football coaches
SMU Mustangs football coaches
Southern Miss Golden Eagles football coaches
Southern Miss Golden Eagles football players
Wake Forest Demon Deacons football coaches
People from Roswell, Georgia
Sportspeople from Fulton County, Georgia
Players of American football from Georgia (U.S. state)
College Football Playoff Selection Committee members